Santino is a masculine given name. Notable people with the name include:
 Santino Ferrucci, American race car driver
 Santino Fontana, American actor
 Santino Garsi (1542–1604), Italian lutenist and composer
 Santino Marella, ring name of WWE wrestler Anthony Carelli
 Santino Quaranta, American soccer player
 Santino Rice, American fashion designer
 Santino Solari, Swiss architect
 Santino William Legan, American perpetrator of the Gilroy Garlic Festival shooting

Fictional characters
 Santino (The Vampire Chronicles), a fictional character in the Vampire Chronicles.
 Sonny Corleone, a fictional character in Mario Puzo's 1969 novel The Godfather and its 1972 film adaptation.
 Santino Guillermo (portrayed by Zaijian Jaranilla), a fictional character in the 2009–2010 ABS-CBN religious drama series May Bukas Pa.

Other
 Santino (chimpanzee), a chimpanzee first observed to have the cognitive skills for forward planning and killed while escaping his enclosure

See also
 Santini, a surname

Italian masculine given names